Danville is an unincorporated, small, rural village in Montgomery County, in the U.S. state of Missouri. It is located just off Interstate 70 at a marked turnoff. There is a combined gas station-food store-lunch counter-florist shop just off the interstate, an automotive repair shop in the village, and a quarry operation just outside it; and no other businesses or services.

History
Danville was laid out in 1834, and named after Danville, Virginia, the native home of an early settler. A post office at Danville was established in 1834, and remained in operation until 1942. A census-designated place (CDP) named after the village, and including it, was established in or after 1980, and census-based demographics since that establishment reflect the entire CDP and not just the village proper.

Demographics

References

1834 establishments in Missouri
Census-designated places in Montgomery County, Missouri
Populated places in Missouri
Populated places established in 1834